The 2020 Catalan motorcycle Grand Prix (officially known as the Gran Premi Monster Energy de Catalunya) was the ninth round of the 2020 Grand Prix motorcycle racing season and the eighth round of the 2020 MotoGP World Championship. It was held at the Circuit de Barcelona-Catalunya in Montmeló on 27 September 2020.

Background

Impact of the COVID-19 pandemic 
The opening rounds of the 2020 championship were heavily affected by the COVID-19 pandemic. Several Grands Prix were cancelled or postponed after the aborted opening round in Qatar, prompting the Fédération Internationale de Motocyclisme to draft a new calendar. On 11 June, a new schedule based solely within Europe was announced. The Catalan Grand Prix, originally scheduled for June 7, was placed on September 27.

MotoGP Championship standings before the race 
After the eighth round at the 2020 Emilia Romagna and Rimini's Coast Grand Prix, Andrea Dovizioso on 83 points, lead the championship by one point over Fabio Quartararo and Maverick Viñales, with Joan Mir a further 4 points behind.

In the Teams' Championship, Petronas Yamaha SRT with 147 points, lead the championship from Monster Energy Yamaha with 141. Suzuki Ecstar Team is third with 124 points, by 9 points over Ducati Team, while Red Bull KTM Factory Racing sat 5th on 110 points.

MotoGP Entrants 

 Stefan Bradl replaced Marc Márquez from the Czech Republic round onwards while he recovered from injuries sustained in his opening round crash.

Free practice

MotoGP 
The first practice session ended with Fabio Quartararo fastest for Petronas Yamaha SRT ahead of Ducati Corse's Andrea Dovizioso and Team Suzuki Ecstar's Joan Mir. The second practice session ended with Franco Morbidelli fastest for Petronas Yamaha SRT, followed by Johann Zarco and Brad Binder.

Combined Free Practice 1-2-3 
The top ten riders (written in bold) qualified in Q2.

Qualifying

MotoGP

Race

MotoGP

Moto2

Moto3

Championship standings after the race
Below are the standings for the top five riders, constructors, and teams after the round.

MotoGP

Riders' Championship standings

Constructors' Championship standings

Teams' Championship standings

Moto2

Riders' Championship standings

Constructors' Championship standings

Teams' Championship standings

Moto3

Riders' Championship standings

Constructors' Championship standings

Teams' Championship standings

Notes

References

External links

Catalan
Catalan motorcycle Grand Prix
Catalan motorcycle Grand Prix
Catalan motorcycle Grand Prix